Linophryne andersoni is a species of leftvent in the genus Linophryne it is found in deep water up to 50m northeast of the Line Islands.

References

Linophrynidae
Deep sea fish
Fish described in 1992